'80s on 8 (also known as The Big '80s on 8) is a commercial-free, satellite radio station on Sirius XM Radio channel 8 and also Dish Network 6008. As a result of the Sirius/XM merger on November 12, 2008, the channel was merged with the Big '80s channel on Sirius 8, and took its current name. The channel plays hit music from the 1980s.

The channel was created in 2000/2001 and programmed by Bruce Kelly, a veteran radio program director and morning drive/afternoon personality. Kelly's morning show was one of XM's highest rated programs. Kelly remained through 2005.

The channel is currently voice-tracked by the four living original MTV VJs: Nina Blackwood, Mark Goodman, Alan Hunter and Martha Quinn (part-time). The hosts record their programs from their homes. There are no live announcers at any time on this channel.

Much like the other decade channels, '80s on 8 attempts to recreate the feel of 1980s radio. It uses JAM Creative Productions' "Warp Factor", "The Flame Thrower," "Skywave" and "Turbo Z" sound effects (made popular in the '80s by Z100 in New York and other stations) for jingles, as well as similar DJ habits, '80s slang, news updates, and occasional vintage commercial clips. The channel was also used for XM's annual pop music chronology, IT.

In 2008, '80s on 8 was the third-most listened to station on the XM service, with an Arbitron-estimated cume of 698,300 listeners per week.

Post Sirius XM merger 
When the merge of XM and Sirius Satellite Radio music and talk channels occurred on November 12, 2008, Rick Stacy was named the channel's program director, and the airstaff consisted of the four surviving original MTV "veejays" - Nina Blackwood, Mark Goodman, Alan Hunter and Martha Quinn, carrying over the lineup of Sirius's Big '80s channel. '80s on 8 was simulcast on both XM and Sirius, and channel imaging was revised to include the phrase "Sirius XM Radio".  It also became Sirius XM Radio's first and only channel to phase out the apostrophe (like on most decades channels on Sirius XM), as they changed their logo entirely (other channels such as The 50s on 5 and The 90s on 9 did so, but the rest of the logos were updated).  However, with the reintroduction of the VJ big 40, the 80s on 8 is starting to sound more like the Sirius channel The Big 80s, complete with a schedule somehow reminiscent of that channel.

Replay America Tour 
On April 26, 2017, it was announced that SiriusXM's '80s on 8 would be presenting the Replay America Tour, offering hits from the 80s. The lineup included the following pop stars from the 80s, who mostly played their best known songs:
 Billy Ocean - This was Billy Ocean's first U.S. tour in 20 years. 
 Greg Kihn (on select dates)
 The Motels featuring Martha Davis
 Naked Eyes
 Starship (featuring Mickey Thomas)
 Taylor Dayne
The tour dates and locations were as follows:
 06/03 - Philadelphia, PA (Private) - Philadelphia Convention Center                
 06/04 - Grand Rapids, MI - Frederik Meijer Gardens & Sculpture Park       
 07/26 - Uncasville, CT - Mohegan Sun                                                            
 07/28 - Staten Island, NY - Richmond Bank Ballpark    
 07/29 - Rochester, NY - The Dome Arena                                                  
 07/30 - Lancaster, PA - Clipper Magazine Stadium                                   
 08/03 - Westbury, NY - NYCB Theatre at Westbury                                    
 08/04 - Bowie, MD - Prince George Stadium                     
 08/05 - Durham, NC - Athletic Park                         
 08/06 - Huber Heights, OH - Rose Music Center at The Heights 
 08/10 - Chattanooga, TN - AT & T Field 
 08/11 - Hickory, NC - L.P. Frans Stadium                                                
 08/12 - Augusta, GA - Lake Olmstead Stadium                               
 08/15 - Albuquerque, NM - Sandia Casino Amphitheater                         
 08/16 - Colorado Springs, CO - Broadmoor World Arena                              
 08/18 - Crestwood, IL - Standard Bank Ballpark                                   
 08/19 - South Bend, IN - Coveleski Regional Stadium                        
 08/20 - Welch, MN - Treasure Island Resort & Casino
A review of the final show reported that the tour "fulfilled its purpose of taking fans back to seemingly more simple times, with the hit songs they grew up with, and a party-like atmosphere. The chance to see some of these acts might be few and far between, so the opportunity to see them all on the same bill, made for a fun and playful evening."

Hosts 
Mark Goodman
Nina Blackwood
Alan Hunter
Martha Quinn (former; now at KOSF in San Francisco)

Internet Player

The internet version can be biased toward dance pop or toward mainstream rock hits.

With Sirius XM's partnership with Pandora the 80s had subchannels for hits, rock, or dance music.

Core artists
Madonna
Michael Jackson
Prince
Journey
Def Leppard
Hall & Oates
Duran Duran
Huey Lewis & The News
Pat Benatar
Phil Collins
Wham!
Cyndi Lauper
Culture Club
Bon Jovi
The Bangles
DJ Jazzy Jeff & The Fresh Prince
Run-DMC
LL Cool J
Janet Jackson

References

External links
SiriusXM: 80s on 8

Sirius Satellite Radio channels
XM Satellite Radio channels
Sirius XM Radio channels
1980s-themed radio stations
Radio stations established in 2001